The Patrician Brothers officially named Brothers of Saint Patrick, abbreviated F.S.P. is a Catholic lay religious congregation of Pontifical Right for men founded for the  religious and literary education of the youth and the instruction of the faithful in Christian piety.

The Patrician Brothers are an Ireland-based Roman Catholic congregation

History
The Congregation of the Brothers of St. Patrick was founded by Bishop Bishop Daniel Delany, on the feast of the Purification of the Blessed Virgin Mary, on the 2nd February, 1808. The four founding members were Patrick McMahon (Brother John Baptiste), Richard Fitzpatrick (Brother Bernard), Ambrose Dawson (Brother Joseph) and Maurice Cummins (Brother John Evangelist). Under the personal instruction of the bishop, the group of men was established as a diocesan institution.
 
In succeeding years, branches were established in other dioceses of Ireland. Around 1846, they were in charge of a trade school near Baltimore, Maryland, in America.  The Brothers were invited by several Indian and Australian bishops to erect schools in their dioceses. Several foundations were made, among them those of Sydney, to which archdiocese the Brothers were invited by Cardinal Moran; and that of Madras in India in 1875, undertaken at the request of Bishop Stephen Fennelly.

For the first eighty years, the Brothers were under the authority of their respective bishops. However, in 1885 the Brothers made application to the Holy See for the approval of the institute, to constitute a central governance board and to establish a common novitiate. Sounding opinions from the bishops in whose dioceses the Brothers were established, Pope Leo XIII provisionally approved the congregation for five years by a Rescript dated 6 January 1888, and, on 8 September 1893, he issued a decree of final confirmation. This included approving their rules and constitution, the facilities and powers necessary for their institute, and constituting India and Australia as separate Provinces. The Brothers of the Provinces of Ireland, India, and Australia, were now under the authority of their elected Congregation Leader and his Council. From 1888 to 2010, the Congregation Leader lived in Ireland, since then India and Australia.

The archive of the Patrician Brothers is stored in the Delany Archive in Carlow College.

Work scope
As of 2022, there were 160 Patrician Brothers serving in seven countries: Ireland (1808), India (1875), Australia (1883), USA (1948), Kenya (1961), Papua New Guinea (1968), Ghana (2008). The Brothers have also ministered in Yemen, Dubai, South Sudan, and Qatar. The largest Province is that of India-Ghana with close to 100 Brothers.

The scope of their work embraces mainly primary, secondary, and tertiary education. But there are Brothers who work in parishes, health centres, and centres for homeless children.

Patrician websites

International: https://patricianbrothers.org
Ireland: https://patricianbrothers.ie
Mountrath: http://mountrathcs.ie
Galway: http://www.bish.ie
Newbridge: http://www.patriciansecondary.com
Mallow: https://www.patricianacademy.com
India & Ghana: https://www.patricianindia.com
Adyar: http://www.st-michaelsacademy.com ; https://www.stpatricksschool.in www.patriciancollege.ac.in
Angamaly: https://www.stpatricksacademy.in
Binnaguri: https://sjsbgi.com
Clement Town: https://www.stpatricksdehradun.in
Coonoor: http://www.stjosephscoonoor.com
Dehra Dun: http://stjosephacademy.in
Dindigul: https://www.spadgl.com
Manendergarh: https://www.facebook.com/ddhsmdgrconfession/
Mananthavady: https://stpatricksmananthavady.com
Meerut: www.stmarysmeerut.com 
https://stpatricksacademymeerut.in
Mussorie: https://www.sgconline.ac.in
New Delhi: http://msmschool.in 
Pune: http://www.mtstpatrickpune.com
Ravulapalem: http://www.sparap.com
Trichy: http://spaalundur.com
Dormaa: https://www.facebook.com/pages/category/School/Dela-ny-Academy-111464500478382/

Australia & PNG

Ryde: https://www.holycrosscollege.org
Granville: https://www.delanygranville.catholic.edu.au 
Blacktown: https://www.patsblacktown.catholic.edu.au 
Fairfield: https://www.pbcfairfield.catholic.edu.au 
Liverpool: https://www.ascc.catholic.edu.au https://www.allsaintscasula.catholic.edu.au https://www.hscarneshill.catholic.edu.au
USA: https://brothersofstpatrick.com
Santa Ana: https://www.materdei.org

Notable Patrician Brothers
 Br Serenus OKelly, Pioneer, (1780-1859)
 Br Paul O'Connor, Galway Pioneer, (1796-1878)
 Br. Dermot Dunne, Superior General & Historian, Patrician Brothers (1950–1956)
 Br. Augustine Holton, Superior General (1980–86)
 Br Linus Walker, Patrician Historian (1930-2021)
 Br. Colm O'Connell, missionary teacher, and athletics coach

References

Other References:

Bishop Daniel Delany and the Brothers of St Patrick, by Br Dermot Dunne fsp, 1955.

By the Narrow Gate, (International history), by Br Linus Walker fsp, 2008.

For His Sake, (Indian history, by Br Berchmans Athakkad fsp, 2008.

Go Into the Vineyard, (Australian and Papua New Guinea history), by Br Stephen Sweetman fsp, 2008.

Like a Tree Planted Near a Stream, (Kenyan history), by Br Colm O'Connell fsp, 2008.

An Education for All, (History of Bishop Delany for school students), by Br Stephen Sweetman fsp, 2013.

External links
 Patrician Brothers International
 Patrician Brothers

Attributions

Institutes of Catholic religious brothers
Religious organizations established in 1808
Catholic religious institutes established in the 19th century
Catholic teaching orders
1808 establishments in Ireland